Benjamin Cronyn (11 July 1802 – 21 September 1871) was the first bishop of the Anglican Diocese of Huron. 

Cronyn was born in Kilkenny, Ireland and educated at Trinity College, Dublin. A member of the prominent Anglo-Irish Protestant Ascendancy Cronyn family, and a relative of Robert Whitehead, he emigrated to Canada in 1832.  He was posted to London, Ontario, where he completed the church building started by his predecessor. In 1844 he relocated the church to a better site, now occupied by St Paul's Cathedral. When the new Diocese of Huron was created in 1857 he was elected its first bishop and travelled to London, UK to be consecrated, the last Canadian bishop required to go to Britain to do so.

A noted Low Church cleric, he distrusted what he considered to be the romanizing tendencies of Toronto's Trinity College, in 1863, he founded Huron University College which in 1908 grew into the secularised University of Western Ontario.

He died in London, Ontario in 1871. He had married in Ireland Margaret Ann Bickerstaff of Lislea, Longford with whom he had seven children. On her death he was remarried to Martha Collins. He was father to Benjamin Cronyn, Jr. a former mayor of London, Ontario. He was the father-in-law of Edward Blake, Premier of Ontario and grandfather of politician Hume Cronyn, Sr. and great-grandfather of actor Hume Cronyn, Jr. and artist Hugh Verschoyle Cronyn GM. 

In 1957, a biography, entitled Benjamin Cronyn: First Bishop of Huron, was written by The Very Reverend Alfred Henchman Crowfoot and was published by The Incorporated Synod of the Diocese of Huron.

See also
 Huron University College

External links
Bibliographic directory from Project Canterbury

References 

 

1802 births
1871 deaths
Irish emigrants to pre-Confederation Ontario
People from Kilkenny (city)
People educated at Kilkenny College
Alumni of Trinity College Dublin
Anglican bishops of Huron
19th-century Anglican Church of Canada bishops
University of Western Ontario
Immigrants to Upper Canada